Wilbur Howard Duncan (October 15, 1910 – March 25, 2005) was a botany professor at the University of Georgia for 40 years where he oversaw an expansion in the school's herbarium collection and described three new plant species.  Duncan also authored several books on plant species of the Eastern and Southeastern United States.

Biography
Duncan was born in Buffalo, New York, on October 15, 1910. He received his bachelor's and master's degrees, in 1932 and 1933, from Indiana University, then his PhD in botany from Duke University in 1938. He then began a forty-year period in the faculty at the University of Georgia.
As Curator of the UGA Herbarium, he increased the collection size from 16,000 to 135,000 specimens. He personally collected over thirty thousand specimens, which he shared with herbaria across the country.

During World War II, Duncan served in the United States Public Health Service, in which he earned the rank of Major. His duties during this period included directing mosquito control for Charleston, South Carolina and serving as state entomologist for Kentucky.

Duncan was married for 64 years (from 1941 until his death) to botanist Marion Bennett Duncan, with whom he collaborated on several books, including Wildflowers of the Eastern United States.

Species described
Duncan is the botanical authority who first described three plant species: Quercus oglethorpensis, Trillium persistens, and Baptisia arachnifera. All of these species are endangered.

Associations and honors
Duncan was a Fellow of the American Association for the Advancement of Science.

Partial bibliography
Duncan, W. H. 1940. A new species of oak from Georgia. Amer. Midland Naturalist 24: 755–756.

Duncan, W. H. 1944. A new species of Baptisia. Rhodora 46: 29–31.
Duncan, W. H. 1950. Quercus oglethorpensis – range extensions and phylogenetic relationships. Lloydia 13: 243–248.
Duncan, W. H., J. F. Garst, and G. A. Neece. 1971. Trillium persistens (Liliaceae), a new pedicellate-flowered species form northeastern Georgia and adjacent North Carolina. Rhodora 73: 244–248.

Duncan, W. H. 1977. A new species of Galactia (Fabaceae) in the southeastern United States. Phytologia 37: 59–61.
Duncan, Wilbur H. & John T. Kartesz, Vascular Flora of Georgia: An Annotated Checklist, 1981, UGA Press

Duncan, Wilbur H. & Marion B. Duncan, The Smithsonian Guide to Seaside Plants of the Gulf and Atlantic Coasts, 140 pp, Smithsonian, 1987,

See also
List of University of Georgia people

Notes

1910 births
2005 deaths
American botanical writers
American male non-fiction writers
American botanists
American entomologists
Duke University alumni
Fellows of the American Association for the Advancement of Science
Indiana University alumni
People from Athens, Georgia
Scientists from Buffalo, New York
University of Georgia faculty
Writers from Georgia (U.S. state)
Writers from Buffalo, New York
United States Public Health Service Commissioned Corps officers
20th-century American zoologists
20th-century American male writers